Ivana Maranić (born 12 September 1991) is a Croatian judoka. She qualified to represent Croatia at the 2020 Summer Olympics in Tokyo 2021, competing in women's +78 kg.

References

External links
 

1991 births
Living people
Croatian female judoka
Judoka at the 2020 Summer Olympics
Olympic judoka of Croatia
European Games competitors for Croatia
Judoka at the 2015 European Games
21st-century Croatian women